Mounts Bay Academy (formerly Mounts Bay School) is an academy school in Heamoor, Penzance, Cornwall, England, UK. The school teaches 960 11- to 16-year-old students. It has specialist status as a Sports and Community College.

Facilities
Mounts Bay occupies five buildings: main building, art block, music/drama block, sports building and 'Qube'. The main building houses most of the departments, with some of the subjects housed in exterior buildings. The newest building, known as the 'Qube' (or 'Cube') was primarily built to teach media.

There is also a Sports Centre with two tennis courts and a multi court. On one of the fields there is a cricket pitch, a hockey pitch, two rounders pitches, a 400m running track, a shot put circle, a javelin area, and a football pitch. On the other field there is a rugby pitch. The school also has a 3G astroturf pitch, erected in 2011

History
The school used to be called Heamoor Secondary School, until it became a comprehensive school in 1980.

The academy  officially gained academy status on 1 July 2011, and changed its name to Mounts Bay Academy.

References

Academies in Cornwall
Educational institutions established in 2011
Secondary schools in Cornwall
Buildings and structures in Penzance
2011 establishments in England